The 1964–65 Austrian Hockey League season was the 35th season of the Austrian Hockey League, the top level of ice hockey in Austria. Eight teams participated in the league, and Klagenfurter AC won the championship.

First round

Final round

Qualification round

External links
Austrian Ice Hockey Association

Austrian Hockey League seasons
Aus
Aust